Almazbek Mirzaliyev  (Kyrgyz: Алмазбек Мирзалиев; Russian: Алмазбек Мирзалиев) is a professional Kyrgyzstani footballer who'se last known club was Dordoi Biškek in the top division of the Kyrgyzstan League.

He is also a Kyrgyzstan national football team player.

Career

Alay osh
Almazbek Mirzaliyev began his career at the club with Alay Osh, in which he played two seasons, scoring 87 match 36 was the best scorer of the club.

Udon Thani F.C.
Season 2012 held in Thai Udon Thani F.C., with him in the Udon Thani F.C. played his teammate Ildar Amirov.

Abdish-Ata Kant
In the season of 2013 he returned to Abdish-Ata, and again became the top scorer in the Top  league 19 matches, scoring 20 goals. By the end of the 2013 season, Mirzaliev reached the milestone of scoring at least 100 goals in Kyrgyzstan League and Cup matches.

In 2014, on loan transferred to his first club in 2014 Alay. Sezon began to draw the group stage of the AFC Cup, its first participation in the tournament Mrzalieva. Mirzaliyev contributed greatly to vyigrash his team in the playoffs match of the AFC Cup 2014, but in the group stage of his club could not get out of the group after losing in five games, bringing one match in a draw.

Dordoi Bishkek

Career statistic
Club statistic

International goals
Scores and results list Kyrgyzstan's goal tally first.

Honours
Abdish Ata
 Kyrgyzstan Cup (3) – 2007,2009,2011.
 Ala-Too Cup  (1) – 2015.

Individual
 Best scorer in Top League (2).
 2007 21 goals.
 2013 20 goals.

References

External links
Almazbek Mirzaliev at playmakerstats.com (English version of zerozero.pt and leballonrond.fr)
Thailand Susu
Thailand Susu

1987 births
Living people
Kyrgyzstan international footballers
Kyrgyzstani footballers
Kyrgyzstani expatriate footballers
Almazbek Mirzaliev
Footballers at the 2006 Asian Games
Association football forwards
Asian Games competitors for Kyrgyzstan
Kyrgyz Premier League players